The 63rd Academy Awards ceremony, organized by the Academy of Motion Picture Arts and Sciences (AMPAS), took place on March 25, 1991, at the Shrine Auditorium in Los Angeles beginning at 6:00 p.m. PST / 9:00 p.m. EST. During the ceremony, Academy Awards (commonly referred to as the Oscars) were presented in 22 categories. The ceremony, which was televised in the United States on ABC, was produced by Gil Cates and directed by Jeff Margolis. Actor Billy Crystal hosted for the second consecutive year. Three weeks earlier in a ceremony held at The Beverly Hilton in Beverly Hills, California on March 2, the Academy Awards for Technical Achievement were presented by host Geena Davis.

Dances with Wolves won seven awards, including Best Picture. Other winners included Dick Tracy with three awards, Ghost with two awards, and American Dream, Creature Comforts, Cyrano de Bergerac, Days of Waiting, Goodfellas, The Hunt for Red October, Journey of Hope, The Lunch Date, Misery, Reversal of Fortune, and Total Recall with one. The telecast garnered nearly 43 million viewers in the United States.

Winners and nominees 

The nominees for the 63rd Academy Awards were announced on February 13, 1991, at 5:38 a.m. PST (13:38 UTC) at the Samuel Goldwyn Theater in Beverly Hills, California, by Karl Malden, president of the Academy, and actor Denzel Washington. Dances with Wolves led the nominations with twelve total; Dick Tracy and The Godfather Part III tied for second with seven each.

The winners were announced during the awards ceremony on March 25, 1991. Kevin Costner became the fifth person to earn the Best Director Award for his directorial debut and to earn nominations for Best Actor and Best Director for the same film. Best Supporting Actress winner Whoopi Goldberg was the second African American woman to win an award. Hattie McDaniel previously won in the same category for Gone With the Wind.

Awards

Winners are listed first, highlighted in boldface and indicated with a double-dagger.
{| class=wikitable
| valign="top" width="50%" |

 Dances with Wolves – Jim Wilson and Kevin Costner, producers Awakenings – Walter Parkes and Lawrence Lasker, producers
 Ghost – Lisa Weinstein, producer
 The Godfather Part III – Francis Ford Coppola, producer
 Goodfellas – Irwin Winkler, producer
| valign="top" width="50%" |

 Kevin Costner – Dances with Wolves
 Francis Ford Coppola – The Godfather Part III
 Martin Scorsese – Goodfellas
 Stephen Frears – The Grifters
 Barbet Schroeder – Reversal of Fortune
|-
| valign="top" |

 Jeremy Irons – Reversal of Fortune as Claus von Bülow
 Kevin Costner – Dances with Wolves as Lieutenant John J. Dunbar/Dances With Wolves
 Robert De Niro – Awakenings as Leonard Lowe
 Gérard Depardieu – Cyrano de Bergerac as Cyrano de Bergerac
 Richard Harris – The Field as "Bull" McCabe
| valign="top" |

 Kathy Bates – Misery as Annie Wilkes
 Anjelica Huston – The Grifters as Lilly Dillon
 Julia Roberts – Pretty Woman as Vivian Ward
 Meryl Streep – Postcards from the Edge as Suzanne Vale
 Joanne Woodward – Mr. and Mrs. Bridge as India Bridge
|-
| valign="top" |

 Joe Pesci – Goodfellas as Tommy DeVito
 Bruce Davison – Longtime Companion as David
 Andy García – The Godfather Part III as Vincent Corleone
 Graham Greene – Dances with Wolves as Kicking Bird
 Al Pacino – Dick Tracy as Alphonse "Big Boy" Caprice
| valign="top" |

 Whoopi Goldberg – Ghost as Oda Mae Brown
 Annette Bening – The Grifters as Myra Langtry
 Lorraine Bracco – Goodfellas as Karen Friedman Hill
 Diane Ladd – Wild at Heart as Marietta Fortune
 Mary McDonnell – Dances with Wolves as Stands with a Fist/Christine Gunther
|-
| valign="top" |

 Ghost – Bruce Joel Rubin
 Alice – Woody Allen
 Avalon – Barry Levinson
 Green Card – Peter Weir
 Metropolitan – Whit Stillman
| valign="top" |

 Dances with Wolves – Michael Blake based on his novel Awakenings – Steven Zaillian from the book by Oliver Sacks
 Goodfellas – Nicholas Pileggi and Martin Scorsese from Wiseguy by Nicholas Pileggi
 The Grifters – Donald E. Westlake based on the book by Jim Thompson
 Reversal of Fortune – Nicholas Kazan based on the book by Alan M. Dershowitz
|-
| valign="top" |

 Journey of Hope (Switzerland) in German – Xavier Koller Cyrano de Bergerac (France) in French – Jean-Paul Rappeneau
 Ju Dou (China) in Mandarin Chinese – Zhang Yimou and Yang Fengliang
 The Nasty Girl (Germany) in German – Michael Verhoeven
 Open Doors (Italy) in Italian – Gianni Amelio
| valign="top" |

 American Dream – Barbara Kopple and Arthur Cohn Berkeley in the Sixties – Mark Kitchell
 Building Bombs – Mark Mori and Susan Robinson
 Forever Activists: Stories from the Veterans of the Abraham Lincoln Brigade – Judith Montell
 Waldo Salt: A Screenwriter's Journey – Robert Hillmann and Eugene Corr
|-
| valign="top" |

 Days of Waiting – Steven Okazaki Burning Down Tomorrow – Kit Thomas
 Chimps: So Like Us – Karen Goodman and Kirk Simon
 Journey into Life: The World of the Unborn – Derek Bromhall
 Rose Kennedy: A Life to Remember – Freida Lee Mock and Terry Sanders
| valign="top" |

 The Lunch Date – Adam Davidson 12:01 PM – Hillary Ripps and Jonathan Heap
 Bronx Cheers – Raymond De Felitta and Matthew Gross
 Dear Rosie – Peter Cattaneo and Barnaby Thompson
 Senzeni Na? (What Have We Done?) – Bernard Joffa and Anthony E. Nicholas
|-
| valign="top" |

 Creature Comforts – Nick Park A Grand Day Out – Nick Park
 Grasshoppers (Cavallette) – Bruno Bozzetto
| valign="top" |

 Dances with Wolves – John Barry Avalon – Randy Newman
 Ghost – Maurice Jarre
 Havana – Dave Grusin
 Home Alone – John Williams
|-
| valign="top" |

 "Sooner or Later (I Always Get My Man)" from Dick Tracy – Music and Lyrics by Stephen Sondheim "Blaze of Glory" from Young Guns II – Music and Lyrics by Jon Bon Jovi
 "I'm Checkin' Out" from Postcards from the Edge – Music and Lyrics by Shel Silverstein
 "Promise Me You'll Remember" from The Godfather Part III – Music by Carmine Coppola; Lyrics by John Bettis
 "Somewhere in My Memory" from Home Alone – Music by John Williams; Lyrics by Leslie Bricusse
| valign="top" |

 Dances with Wolves – Jeffrey Perkins, Bill W. Benton, Gregory H. Watkins, and Russell Williams II Days of Thunder – Charles M. Wilborn, Donald O. Mitchell, Rick Kline, and Kevin O'Connell
 Dick Tracy – Thomas Causey, Chris Jenkins, David E. Campbell, and Doug Hemphill
 The Hunt for Red October – Richard Bryce Goodman, Richard Overton, Kevin F. Cleary, and Don Bassman
 Total Recall – Nelson Stoll, Michael J. Kohut, Carlos Delarios, and Aaron Rochin
|-
| valign="top" |

 The Hunt for Red October – Cecelia Hall and George Watters II Flatliners – Charles L. Campbell and Richard C. Franklin
 Total Recall – Stephen Hunter Flick
| valign="top" |

 Dick Tracy – Art Direction: Richard Sylbert; Set Decoration: Rick Simpson Cyrano de Bergerac – Art Direction: Ezio Frigerio; Set Decoration: Jacques Rouxel
 Dances with Wolves – Art Direction: Jeffrey Beecroft; Set Decoration: Lisa Dean
 The Godfather Part III – Art Direction: Dean Tavoularis; Set Decoration: Gary Fettis
 Hamlet – Art Direction: Dante Ferretti; Set Decoration: Francesca Lo Schiavo
|-
| valign="top" |

 Dick Tracy – John Caglione Jr. and Doug Drexler Cyrano de Bergerac – Michèle Burke and Jean-Pierre Eychenne
 Edward Scissorhands – Ve Neill and Stan Winston
| valign="top" |

 Cyrano de Bergerac – Franca Squarciapino Avalon – Gloria Gresham
 Dances with Wolves – Elsa Zamparelli
 Dick Tracy – Milena Canonero
 Hamlet – Maurizio Millenotti
|-
| valign="top" |

 Dances with Wolves – Dean Semler Avalon – Allen Daviau
 Dick Tracy – Vittorio Storaro
 The Godfather Part III – Gordon Willis
 Henry & June – Philippe Rousselot
|
 Dances with Wolves'' – Neil Travis
 Ghost – Walter Murch
 The Godfather Part III – Barry Malkin, Lisa Fruchtman, and Walter Murch
 Goodfellas – Thelma Schoonmaker
 The Hunt for Red October – Dennis Virkler and John Wright
|}

Academy Honorary Awards
 Sophia Loren
"One of the genuine treasures of world cinema who, in a career rich with memorable performances, has added permanent luster to our art form."
 Myrna Loy
"In recognition of her extraordinary qualities both on screen and off, with appreciation for a lifetime's worth of indelible performances."
Irving G. Thalberg Memorial Award
David Brown and Richard D. Zanuck
Academy Special Achievement Award
 Eric Brevig, Rob Bottin, Tim McGovern, and Alex Funke for the visual effects of Total RecallMultiple nominations and awards

The following 15 films had multiple nominations:

The following three films received multiple awards.

 Presenters and performers 
The following individuals, listed in order of appearance, presented awards or performed musical numbers.

Presenters

Performers

Ceremony information

Riding on the critical praise from last year's ceremony, the Academy rehired former film producer and former Directors Guild of America president Gilbert Cates to oversee production of the Oscar ceremony for the second straight time. Two months before the awards gala, Cates selected actor and comedian Billy Crystal to host the show for the second consecutive year. In a statement released by AMPAS, Crystal joked, "It's a great honor, and I hope to bring the show in under nine hours."

As with the last year's theme of "Around the World in 3 1/2 Hours," Cates centered the show around a theme. He christened the ceremony with the theme "100 Years of Film" in celebration to the centennial of the development of both the kinetoscope by Thomas Edison and celluloid film by Eastman Kodak. In tandem with the theme, the show featured an ambitious opening segment. Actor Michael Caine introduced the segment live via satellite from the Salon Indien du Grand Café in Paris, where the short film L'Arrivée d'un train en gare de La Ciotat made its debut in 1895. After a brief clip of the film, the show cut back to the Shrine Auditorium stage where actress Jasmine Guy and other dancers performed whilst a montage of film clips were projected in the background. Filmmaker Chuck Workman filmed a vignettes featuring actors such as Sally Field, Andy García, and Anjelica Huston discussing the first movie the actors watched.

Several other people participated in the production of the ceremony. Film composer and musician Bill Conti served as musical director for the ceremony. Dancer Debbie Allen choreographed a dancer number showcasing the Best Original Score nominees. Despite losing eight members of her band in a plane crash, a visibly emotional Reba McEntire performed the Best Original Song nominee "I'm Checkin' Out" from the film Postcards from the Edge. At the beginning of the ceremony, wrangler Lisa Brown escorted host Crystal, and Beechnut, a horse that was prominently featured in the upcoming film City Slickers.

This ceremony was the last year in which there were no official nominees for Academy Award for Best Visual Effects. Back to the Future Part III, Dick Tracy, Ghost and Total Recall advanced to a second stage of voting, but only Total Recall received a requisite average and it was given a special achievement Oscar.

Box office performance of nominees
At the time of the nominations announcement on February 12, the combined gross of the five Best Picture nominees at the US box office was $458.2 million with an average of $41 million per film. Ghost was the highest earner among the Best Picture nominees with $213.5 million in domestic box office receipts. The film was followed by Dances with Wolves ($104.3 million), The Godfather Part III ($62.5 million), Goodfellas ($41 million), and finally Awakenings ($36.7 million).

Of the top 50 highest-grossing films of the year, 51 nominations went to 12 films on the list. Only Ghost (2nd), Pretty Woman (3rd), Dances with Wolves (8th), Dick Tracy (9th), The Godfather Part III (17th), Goodfellas (30th), and Awakenings (34th) were nominated for Best Picture, directing, acting or screenwriting. The other top 50 box office hits that earned the nominations were Home Alone (1st), The Hunt for Red October (5th), Total Recall (6th), Days of Thunder (12th), and Edward Scissorhands (22nd).

Critical reviews
The show received a mixed reception from media publications. Some media outlets were more critical of the show. Rick DuBrow of the Los Angeles Times wrote, "It was a long day's journey into night for Oscar, one of the most effective sleeping pills of the year." He also added that while host Crystal started out strong, his jokes fell flat as the night progressed. The Washington Post television critic Tom Shales noted that Crystal, "followed many gags by instantly rating the reaction of the audience, as if it were up to them to please him instead of the other way around." In addition, he commented, "The Oscars seemed more of a fizzle than usual this year." Columnist Dan Craft of The Pantagraph remarked, "The Oscar show has become innocuously hip and yuppified. Kitsch and nostalgia have given way to efficiency and upward mobility. Everyone is tiresomely well-behaved and, worse, well-dressed." He also commented that host Crystal's insider showbiz jokes fell flat and were confusing to television audiences.

Other media outlets received the broadcast more positively. Columnist Harold Schindler of The Salt Lake Tribune wrote, "Billy Crystal kept things moving Monday night in such a manner that the extra quarter-hour was scarcely noticeable." He also said of the telecast's theme of film history, "The Academy used its film library to excellent advantage." Film critic Leonard Maltin remarked, "Emotions ran high and they gave us all a chance to feel vicariously what it might be like to win this kind of award...good guys finishing first and the part of Hollywood we like best, a happy ending." Orlando Sentinel'' film critic Jay Boyar complimented Crystal for invigorating the gala noting that his "clever remarks at the academy's 63rd annual awards presentation struck an entertaining balance between inside-Hollywood quips and general-audience jests."

Ratings and reception
The American telecast on ABC drew in an average of 42.7 million people over its length, which was a 6% increase from the previous year's ceremony. An estimated 76 million total viewers watched all or part of the awards. The show also drew higher Nielsen ratings compared to the previous ceremony with 28.4% of households watching over a 48 share. It was the most watched Oscars telecast since the 56th ceremony held in 1984.

In July 1991, the ceremony presentation received nine nominations at the 43rd Primetime Emmys. The following month, the ceremony won three of those nominations for Outstanding Variety, Music, or Comedy Program (Gil Cates), Outstanding Individual Performance in a Variety or Music Program (Billy Crystal), and Outstanding Writing for a Variety or Music Program (Hal Kanter, Buz Kohan, Billy Crystal, David Steinberg, Bruce Vilanch, and Robert Wuhl).

See also

 11th Golden Raspberry Awards
 33rd Grammy Awards
 43rd Primetime Emmy Awards
 44th British Academy Film Awards
 45th Tony Awards
 48th Golden Globe Awards
 List of submissions to the 63rd Academy Awards for Best Foreign Language Film

References

Bibliography

External links
Official websites
 Academy Awards Official website
 The Academy of Motion Picture Arts and Sciences Official website
 Oscar's Channel at YouTube (run by the Academy of Motion Picture Arts and Sciences)

Analysis
 1990 Academy Awards Winners and History Filmsite
 Academy Awards, USA: 1991 Internet Movie Database

Other resources
 

1990 film awards
1991 in Los Angeles
Academy Awards ceremonies
Primetime Emmy Award for Outstanding Variety Series winners
1991 in American cinema
March 1991 events in the United States
Academy
Television shows directed by Jeff Margolis